Alien Highway: Encounter 2 is an isometric action game released by Vortex in 1986 for the ZX Spectrum and Amstrad CPC. It was programmed by Mark Haigh-Hutchinson and is the sequel to Highway Encounter.

Gameplay 
Gameplay is similar to Highway Encounter, with the player controlling a "Vorton" robot in its attempt to deliver a bomb to an alien base at the end of a highway. Various enemies and obstacles lie in its path.

A notable difference is that the player has a single Vorton with an energy meter, instead of five lives; accordingly, the bomb must be pushed by the player, whereas in the previous game it was pushed by the player's spare Vortons.

Development 
Mark Haigh-Hutchinson, the developer
"After Highway Costa [Panayi] wanted to come up with something completely different again. Since I was now working full-time for Vortex it was decided that I should write Alien Highway whilst Costa developed his new ideas. I had previously written Android One for the Amstrad CPC (in my spare time at University) and then converted Highway Encounter to the CPC in 8 weeks after graduation. Alien Highway attempted to retain the essence of the original game yet expand the gameplay and introduce a random element into the game. It was also considerably faster than the original."

Reception 

Alien Highway received positive reviews.

References

External links
 

1986 video games
Action video games
Amstrad CPC games
Video games developed in the United Kingdom
Video games with isometric graphics
Vortex Software games
ZX Spectrum games